The 2006 King's Cup finals were held from 24 to 30 December 2006 at the Suphachalasai Stadium in Bangkok, Thailand. The King's Cup (คิงส์คัพ) is an annual football tournament; the first tournament was played in 1968. 

Hosts Thailand won the tournament beating  Vietnam 3–1 in the final. Kazakhstan and Singapore were the other teams to play in this tournament.

Matches

Round robin tournament

Final

Winner

Scorers 

3 goals:
  Phan Thanh Binh
2 goals:
  Kiatisuk Senamuang
  Pipat Thonkanya
  Suchao Nuchnum
  Le Cong Vinh
1 goal:
  Murat Suyumagambetov
  Denis Rodionov
  Kairat Ashirbekov
  Daniel Bennett
  Fazrul Nawaz
  Sarayuth Chaikamdee
  Datsakorn Thonglao
  Sutee Suksomkit
  Le Hong Minh
  Le Tan Tai

External links
RSSSF

King's Cup
Kings Cup, 2006